These are the official results of the Women's High Jump event at the 1992 Summer Olympics in Barcelona, Spain. There were a total number of 41 participating athletes and one non starter. The qualification mark was set at 1.92 metres.

Medalists

Records
These were the standing world and Olympic records (in metres) prior to the 1992 Summer Olympics.

Results

Qualification

Final

See also
 National champions high jump (women)
 1990 Women's European Championships High Jump (Split)
 1991 Women's World Championships High Jump (Tokyo)
 1993 Women's World Championships High Jump (Stuttgart)
 1994 Women's European Championships High Jump (Helsinki)

References

External links
 Official Report
 Results

H
High jump at the Olympics
1992 in women's athletics
Women's events at the 1992 Summer Olympics